The Bhopal - Lucknow / Pratapgarh Express is a weekly superfast train which runs between Bhopal Junction railway station of Bhopal, the capital city of Madhya Pradesh and Lucknow, the capital city of Uttar Pradesh and then to a neighbouring town called Pratapgarh.

Number and nomenclature
The train number is :
 12183 - From Bhopal Junction to Pratapgarh Junction
 12184 - From Pratapgarh Junction to Bhopal Junction

Arrival and departure
Train no.12183 departs from Bhopal Junction every Sunday, Tuesday, Friday at 19:20 hrs., reaching Pratapgarh Junction at 09:05 hrs. the next day.
Train no.12184 departs from Pratapgarh Junction every Monday, Wednesday, Saturday at 19:10 hrs., reaching Bhopal Junction the next day at 08:50 hrs.

Route and halts
The train goes via Bina - Jhansi - Kanpur rail route. The important halts of the train are :

 BHOPAL JUNCTION
 Vidisha
 Bina Junction
 Lalitpur
 Jhansi Junction
 Orai
 Kanpur Central
 LUCKNOW
 Rae Bareli Junction
 Amethi
 Pratapgarh Junction

Coach composite
The train normally consist a total of 21 Coaches which are :

The train does not have any pantry car.

Average speed and frequency
The train has an average speed of 68 km/hour from both the sites.

Other trains from Bhopal to Lucknow

 12183/12184 - Bhopal - Lucknow Express (tri weekly)
 12529/12530 - Bhopal - Lucknow Garibrath Express

References
 

Transport in Bhopal
Rail transport in Madhya Pradesh
Rail transport in Uttar Pradesh
Express trains in India
Transport in Pratapgarh, Uttar Pradesh